Vaccinium fuscatum, the black highbush blueberry, is a species of flowering plant in the heath family (Ericaceae). It is native to North America, where it is found in Ontario, Canada and the eastern United States. Its typical natural habitat is wet areas such as bogs, pocosins, and swamps. 

Vaccinium fuscatum is an upright deciduous shrub. It can be distinguished from the similar-looking Vaccinium corymbosum by its stems and abaxial leaf surfaces are pubescent with dingy hairs, and its dark colored fruit that lacks a glaucous coating. In addition it has an earlier bloom time, producing flowers in early spring. It is sometimes considered a synonym of Vaccinium corymbosum.

References

fuscatum
Blueberries
Flora of Eastern Canada
Flora of the Northeastern United States
Flora of the Southeastern United States
Flora of the South-Central United States
Flora of the North-Central United States